Yevgeni Sergeyevich Shvoren (born 13 December 1982) is a former Russian professional football player.

Club career
He played in the Russian Football National League for FC Dynamo Makhachkala in 2002. He made one appearance for PFC Spartak Nalchik on 20 September 2006 in a Russian Cup game against FC Sibir Novosibirsk.

References

1982 births
Sportspeople from Kaliningrad
Living people
Russian footballers
Association football defenders
FC Baltika Kaliningrad players
PFC Spartak Nalchik players
FC Chernomorets Novorossiysk players
FC Olimpia Volgograd players
FC Zhemchuzhina Sochi players
FC Spartak-MZhK Ryazan players
FC Dynamo Makhachkala players